Royal Prussian Jagdstaffel 51, commonly abbreviated to Jasta 51, was a "hunting group" (i.e., fighter squadron) of the Luftstreitkräfte, the air arm of the Imperial German Army during World War I. The squadron would score over 24 aerial victories during the war. The unit's victories came at the expense of 10 killed in action, two killed in a mid-air collision, two wounded in action, one injured in an aviation accident, and two taken prisoner of war. A member of this unit was Friedrich Karl Florian Nazi Gauleiter of Düsseldorf, Germany.

History
Jasta 51 was founded on 27 December 1917. It went operational on 9 January 1918. Also in January, it joined Jagdgruppe 3. Its first aerial victory came 14 March 1918. The squadron would operate its Fokker D.VIIs through war's end.

Commanding officers (Staffelführer)
 Hans-Eberhardt Gandert: 27 December 1917 – 29 September 1918
 Karl Plauth: 10 October 1918 – ca 11 November 1918

Duty stations
 Wynghene: 10 January 1918
 Jabbeke, Belgium: 1 February 1918

References

Bibliography
 

51
Military units and formations established in 1917
1917 establishments in Germany
Military units and formations disestablished in 1918